Ádám Albert (born 16 October 1990) is a professional Hungarian footballer who plays for Dorog.

Career
In February 2019, Albert joined Jászberényi FC.

On 8 July 2022, Albert returned to Dorog.

Club statistics

Updated to games played as of 4 March 2014.

References

External links
 HLSZ 
 

1990 births
Footballers from Budapest
21st-century Hungarian people
Living people
Hungarian footballers
Association football midfielders
Vác FC players
Egri FC players
Kaposvári Rákóczi FC players
Ceglédi VSE footballers
Soroksár SC players
Dorogi FC footballers
Szolnoki MÁV FC footballers
Tiszakécske FC footballers
Nemzeti Bajnokság I players
Nemzeti Bajnokság II players
Nemzeti Bajnokság III players